Greenfield is an English surname. Notable people with the surname include:

Adam Greenfield (born 1968), American writer
Albert M. Greenfield (1887 – 1967), American businessman and philanthropist
Allen H. Greenfield, American-born occultist and author.
Dave Greenfield (1949–2020), British keyboard player of The Stranglers
Edward Greenfield (1928 – 2015) English music critic and broadcaster.
Elizabeth Greenfield (1809 – 1876), African American singer
Ernest Greenfield, British archaeologist
Hana Greenfield, Czechoslovakian-born Holocaust survivor and Israeli writer; married to Murray Greenfield
Herbert Greenfield, Canadian politician
Howard Greenfield (1936 – 1986), American songwriter
Jeff Greenfield (born 1943), American television journalist and author
Jerry Greenfield (born 1951), American entrepreneur
John Greenfield (or Groenveldt) (1647?-1710?), Dutch physician and surgeon imprisoned in Newgate Prison in 1697 for his innovative methods
Joseph Godwin Greenfield (1884 – 1958) Scottish neuropathologist
Lauren Greenfield, American documentary photographer
Lee Greenfield (1941-2023), American politician
Luke Greenfield, American film director
Matt Greenfield, American co-founder of ADV Films
Matthew Greenfield, American film producer
Max Greenfield, American actor
Meg Greenfield, American journalist
Michael Greenfield (racing driver), American owner-driver in the CART series
Michael Greenfield (rugby league), Australian National Rugby League player
Murray Greenfield, American-born Israeli writer and publisher]
Robby Greenfield, American businessman, activist, philanthropist and former college athlete.
Robert Greenfield, American writer
Ruth W. Greenfield, American musician and teacher
Timothy Greenfield-Sanders, American photographer, son of Ruth W. Greenfield
Isca Greenfield-Sanders, American artist, daughter of Timothy Greenfield-Sanders
Susan Greenfield, British scientist
Theresa Greenfield, American politician
Thomas B. Greenfield, Canadian scholar and theorist of educational administration
 Veronica Greenfield (1946-2022) aka Ronnie Spector, American singer
William Greenfield, the Lord Chancellor of England and the Archbishop of York

English-language surnames
Surnames of English origin